Monster Munchies is a cookery show which is broadcast on the British television channel Good Food. It is hosted by Matt Dawson.

Format 
Teams made up of local cooks from the location where the episode is filmed, make mega dishes within a 24-hour time limit, sourcing large quantities of ingredients and firing up industrial-sized ovens. Five local judges will cast their eye over the enormous creations, and hundreds of local people will eat the dishes when they're completed. The winning team get a large gold wooden spoon.

Series 2 
Series 2 began airing in November 2011.

References 

UKTV original programming
2011 British television series debuts
2011 British television series endings
British cooking television shows